Mansonia indiana is a species of zoophilic mosquito belonging to the genus Mansonia. It is found in Sri Lanka, Java, India, Myanmar, Malaya, Singapore, Sumatra, Thailand, and New Guinea. It is a vector of nocturnally subperiodic Brugia malayi. Females are known to be strongly anthropophilic (human biters). Larvae found only in association with Pistia species.

References

External links
Semiochemicals of Mansonia Indiana
Man biting activity of Mansonia annulifera and Mansonia indiana in Burdwan, West Bengal, India
Laboratory colonization of Mansonia species

indiana
Insects described in 1930